Edward Mørk (28 November 1888 – 1962) was a Norwegian trade unionist and politician for the Labour Party.

He was a typographer by profession, but entered politics via Norges Socialdemokratiske Ungdomsforbund in 1906. He was the national leader of the organization in 1909, 1911 and 1914. He then chaired Oslo faglige samorg from 1920 to 1932, and was also a secretariat member in the Norwegian Confederation of Trade Unions from 1925 to 1927. He was a proponent of local trade union confederations. At the Norwegian Confederation of Trade Unions congress in 1923 he proposed that fourteen representatives from the local confederations got a place in the supervisory council. The proposal was voted down with 102 against 101 votes. From 1932 he led the Employment Office (Arbeidskontoret) in Oslo.

In 1934 he was excluded from the Labour Party for failing to mortify accusations of corruption. He died in 1962.

References

1888 births
1962 deaths
Norwegian trade unionists
Labour Party (Norway) politicians
Politicians from Oslo